Daphnella louisae is a species of sea snail, a marine gastropod mollusk in the family Raphitomidae.

Description
The length of the shell attains 7 mm.

Distribution
This marine species occurs in the Caribbean Sea off Aruba.

References

 Liu J.Y. [Ruiyu] (ed.). (2008). Checklist of marine biota of China seas. China Science Press. 1267 pp

External links
 
 De Jong K.M. & Coomans H.E. (1988) Marine gastropods from Curaçao, Aruba and Bonaire. Leiden: E.J. Brill. 261 pp. (Also published as: Studies on the fauna of Curaçao and other Caribbean islands, 69) 

louisae
Gastropods described in 1988